Aureimonas frigidaquae is a Gram-negative, catalase- and oxidase-positive, facultatively anaerobic bacteria from the genus of Aurantimonas which was isolated from a water-cooling system in Gwangyang in the Republic of Korea. Aurantimonas frigidaquae was reclassified to Aureimonas frigidaquae.

References

External links
Type strain of Aureimonas frigidaquae at BacDive -  the Bacterial Diversity Metadatabase

Hyphomicrobiales
Bacteria described in 2011